Timespace may refer to:

 Spacetime, any mathematical model that combines space and time into a single continuum
 "Time Space" (EP), the 2012 single by Japanese singer and voice actress Nana Mizuki
 Timespace: The Best of Stevie Nicks, a greatest hits album by Stevie Nicks
 TimeSpace, a concept of the temporal turn in the social sciences

See also

Spacetime (disambiguation)
Time (disambiguation)
Space (disambiguation)
Space and Time (disambiguation)